Anglo-Orthodoxy can refer to either:

 A movement among Anglicans toward incorporating some elements of Eastern Orthodox spirituality, theology or worship into the Anglican churches, or a movement than portrays Anglicanism as a via media between Western and Eastern Christianity (by analogy with the term Anglo-Catholicism)
Western Rite Orthodoxy using Anglican-derived liturgies

References